Schefflera lukwangulensis is a species of plant in the family Araliaceae. It is endemic to Tanzania.

References

Flora of Tanzania
lukwangulensis
Vulnerable plants
Taxonomy articles created by Polbot